Carlisle Albert Herman Trost (April 24, 1930 – September 29, 2020) was a United States Navy officer who served as the 23rd Chief of Naval Operations (CNO) and a member of the Joint Chiefs of Staff from July 1, 1986 to June 29, 1990. He oversaw the Navy during the end of the Cold War, and the preparations for the Gulf War of 1991. He retired from active naval service on July 1, 1990, following completion of a four-year term as CNO.

Early life and education
Trost was born in Valmeyer, Illinois, on April 24, 1930. Trost graduated first in his United States Naval Academy class of 1953 and was commissioned as an ensign.

Career
Trost volunteered and was accepted to begin submarine training in 1954 and once again graduated first in his class from Submarine School in New London, Connecticut. During his more than thirty-seven years of commissioned service, Trost served at sea in destroyers and diesel-powered and nuclear submarines, including tours as executive officer of two nuclear-powered submarines and as commanding officer of a Fleet Ballistic Missile submarine. 

After selection to flag rank in 1973, Trost commanded Submarine Flotilla One/Submarine Group FIVE. Later operational assignments included deputy commander, United States Pacific Fleet; commander, Seventh Fleet (1980–1981); Commander-in-Chief, United States Atlantic Fleet (1985–1986), and deputy commander, United States Atlantic Command. 

Trost served as military assistant to the Deputy Secretary of Defense, executive assistant to the Secretary of the Navy, and on the Navy Staff as Director, Systems Analysis Division, Assistant Chief of Naval Personnel and Director, Navy Program Planning.

In May 1986, Trost was nominated by President Ronald Reagan to succeed Admiral James D. Watkins as Chief of Naval Operations (CNO). Trost served as CNO from July 1, 1986 to June 29, 1990. He was succeeded by Admiral Frank B. Kelso.

Awards and decorations

Trost was an Olmsted Scholar. He was active in the Boy Scouts of America as an adult, an Eagle Scout and recipient of the Distinguished Eagle Scout Award.

Organizational affiliations
Trost was recognized as a distinguished graduate of the United States Naval Academy and also served on the board of directors of the Alumni Association, as well as President of the Class of '53. A classmate and another past President of the Class of '53 was the late Texas businessman and former presidential candidate H. Ross Perot.

Post-naval career
Since his retirement from the Navy, Trost served on the boards of directors of a number of corporations. He served as Chairman of the Board of the United States Naval Academy Alumni Association in a term that ended in Spring 2009. Trost died on September 29, 2020 at the age of 90.

Notes

References

External links

Biography of Trost from Shipmate (Spring 2003 issue), the magazine of the U.S. Naval Academy Alumni Association and Foundation.
Carlisle Trost's obituary

1930 births
2020 deaths
Burials at the United States Naval Academy Cemetery
Chiefs of Naval Operations
Joint Chiefs of Staff
Military personnel from Illinois
People from Monroe County, Illinois
Recipients of the Defense Distinguished Service Medal
Recipients of the Navy Distinguished Service Medal
Recipients of the Distinguished Service Medal (US Army)
Recipients of the Legion of Merit
United States Naval Academy alumni
United States Navy admirals
United States submarine commanders
Recipients of the Air Force Distinguished Service Medal
Recipients of the Humanitarian Service Medal